Dharma Puthra is a 2006 Sri Lankan comedy film directed by Louis Vanderstraaten and produced by Nimal Sumanasekara for Bensimo CIne Art Productions. It stars Wasantha Kumaravila, and Anusha Damayanthi in lead roles along with Ruddhika Rambukwella and Raja Fernando. Music composed by Charaka Madusanka.

Damayanthi won a merit award at 31st Sarasaviya Awards for the acting. After the few days of screening, the film was removed from the theaters, where the producer took actions against the financial loss he faced due to the film.

Cast
 Wasantha Kumaravila as Dharma
 Anusha Damayanthi as Maduri
 Buddhika Rambukwella as Vipula
 Nimal Sumanasekara
 Dayananda Jayawardena
 Raja Fernando
 Vimal Jayakody
 Janaki de Silva
 Aravinda Irugalbandara 
 Hemantha Rathnakumara

References

2006 films
2006 comedy films
2000s Sinhala-language films
Sri Lankan comedy films